The men's discus throw event at the 2007 European Athletics U23 Championships was held in Debrecen, Hungary, at Gyulai István Atlétikai Stadion on 13 and 14 July.

Medalists

Results

Final
14 July

Qualifications
13 July
Qualifying 56.00 or 12 best to the Final

Group A

Group B

Participation
According to an unofficial count, 21 athletes from 14 countries participated in the event.

 (1)
 (2)
 (1)
 (1)
 (2)
 (1)
 (3)
 (1)
 (2)
 (1)
 (1)
 (1)
 (1)
 (3)

References

Discus throw
Discus throw at the European Athletics U23 Championships